Calvini is a commune in Buzău County, Muntenia, Romania. It is composed of five villages: Bâscenii de Jos, Bâscenii de Sus, Calvini, Frăsinet and Olari.

Notes

Communes in Buzău County
Localities in Muntenia